The Confederation of Malagasy Workers (FMM) is a national trade union center in Madagascar. It is affiliated with the International Trade Union Confederation.

References

Trade unions in Madagascar
International Trade Union Confederation
Trade unions established in 1957